Manhunt (simplified Chinese: 追捕; traditional Chinese; 追捕; pinyin; Zhuībǔ) is a 2017 action thriller film co-written and directed by John Woo, produced by Gordon Chan, and starring Zhang Hanyu, Masaharu Fukuyama, Qi Wei, Ha Ji-won, and Jun Kunimura. The Chinese-Hong Kong co-production is an adaptation of the Japanese novel Kimi yo Funnu no Kawa o Watare by Juko Nishimura, which was previously adapted in a 1976 film of the same name. Woo decided to develop an adaptation to commemorate the film's star Ken Takakura, who had become a cultural icon in China after the film was the first to be released in China following the Cultural Revolution.

The film was shot on-location in Osaka and Kansai, Japan, and features a mixed Chinese, Japanese, and Korean cast, with dialogue in Mandarin, Japanese, and English. It has been described by Woo as a return to his older style of films, specifically mentioning The Killer. The film premiered at the 74th Venice International Film Festival and released in China on 24 November 2017. It was released worldwide on Netflix on 4 May 2018.

Plot
Du Qiu is a Chinese attorney employed by Osaka-based Tenjin Pharmaceuticals, having successfully defended the company against numerous high-profile lawsuits. About to be relocated to the United States by his management, Qiu attends a party where Tenjin President Yoshihiro Sakai appoints his son, Hiroshi, as the new head of research-and-development. Qiu briefly meets a half-Chinese woman, Mayumi, but loses track of her. Sakai tells a mysterious woman to seduce Qiu into remaining in Japan. She dances with him at the party then sneaks to his house before he arrives later.

Qiu awakens to find the woman dead in his bed. He calls the police and pleads his innocence, but is nonetheless taken into custody. The arresting officer, Yuji Asano, suddenly knocks out another officer and tells Qiu to run. Qiu loses pursuing police by fleeing to a subway station under-construction. Veteran detective Satoshi Yamura is called in with his rookie partner Rika to track down Qiu, much to Asano's chagrin. Following his intuition, Yamura and Rika travel to the construction site where they find Qiu disguised as an employee. Qiu holds Rika hostage with a nail gun, but Yamura surrenders himself and his gun to save Rika. Qiu takes Yamura hostage and claims he is innocent but the two end up in a fistfight, Yamura eventually gets the upper hand but Qiu overpowers Yamura after he is distracted by white pigeons. Qiu manages to escape apprehension and seeks shelter in a nearby shanty town, where he's befriended by the Mandarin-literate local Sakaguchi.

Seeking answers, Qiu contacts Sakai and demands a face-to-face meeting, suspecting that his former employers have set him up. Sakai secretly hires a pair of assassins, Rain and Dawn, to kill Qiu, and sends one of his lawyers to the arranged meeting spot. He explains to Qiu that Sakai and Hiroshi have been secretly developing projects for military contractors. Aiming at Qiu with a sniper rifle, Rain is unable to carry through with the hit because Qiu had earlier shown her kindness, shooting and killing the lawyer instead. Yamura pursues Qiu in a high-speed jet ski chase and nearly catches him, but Qiu is suddenly intercepted by Mayumi, who helps him escape on a Shinkansen.

Fleeing to her remote farmhouse, Mayumi explains that her fiancé, a scientist employed by Tenjin, was falsely accused by the company of stealing their classified formula, and subsequently committed suicide on their wedding day after losing the lawsuit led by Qiu. Qiu apologizes, insisting that the information he was given in regards to the case came directly from the authorities. The two are suddenly ambushed by Rain and Dawn on motorcycles, but Yamura arrives and fends them off while they flee. Yamura pursues Qiu and saves him and Mayumi after their car wrecks before handcuffing himself to Qiu, insisting on taking him in. Mayumi tells Yamura that she was with Qiu at the time of the murder, proving his innocence. The trio hole up at the farmhouse, where they manage to fend off an assault by an army of hitmen, but not before Yamura is shot. Dawn is severely injured and injects herself with a stimulant to recover, but overdoses and dies in Rain's arms. Rika subsequently drives Yamura and Qiu to a hospital, and they let Qiu go.

Blackmailed over his drug addiction, Asano reveals himself to be working for Sakai and demands he be compensated for his part in framing Qiu to divert attention from the real murderer, Hiroshi. Sakai swiftly has Asano killed by Rain. Meanwhile, Rika runs an analysis on Asano's drugs, and finds they match the formula Mayumi's fiancé had been working on. Mayumi gives Rika a secret equation necessary for decoding the formula to properly reproduce the drug, a powerful stimulant, before she is captured by Rain.

Sakaguchi helps Qiu sneak onto a truck carrying Tenjin test subjects, but once at the laboratory he is separated from the others and subjected to an excruciating treatment that causes him to become an involuntarily violent, nigh-invulnerable killer. Sakaguchi tries to kill the other prisoners, but has a moment of clarity and commits suicide. Sakai recognizes Qiu among the subjects and order he be subjected to the treatment, designed to turn a person into a near-superhuman, brainwashed soldier.

Yamura arrives and offers Sakai the decoding equation in exchange for Qiu. Rain, realizing that Sakai is ultimately responsible for Dawn's death, releases Mayumi and gives her a gun. Qiu is injected and forced to fight Yamura, but he manages to break his conditioning and the two turn on the guards with the help of Rain. Qiu, Yamura, Mayumi and Rain end up fighting through hordes of guards through intense firefights. Hiroshi injects himself with the updated formula, surviving several gunshot wounds before finally succumbing and dying, confessing to the murder Qiu was accused of. Sakai shoots Rain, and wounds Qiu but is cornered by Qiu and Yamura, begrieved by his son's death, Sakai commits suicide. Rain dies in Qiu's arms, and Rika arrives with police backup.

Weeks later, Qiu meets Yamura at a train station, where they shake hands and exchange names in Japanese and Mandarin, respectively. Yamura bids Qin farewell as he boards the train with Mayumi, before walking off with Rika.

Cast

Production

Development
After the death of Japanese actor Ken Takakura, Woo searched for material to commemorate him. During this search, he was contacted by Peter Lam, the head of Media Asia, who asked if he would like to do remake of the Japanese film Manhunt. Woo's Manhunt is an adaptation of the Japanese novel Kimi yo Fundo no Kawa o Watare by Juko Nishimura which had previously been adapted into a Japanese film starring Takakura. Woo decided to make a new adaptation of the film, stating that "Ken Takakura is one of my favorite actors in the world. He was my idol, and he has influenced a lot of my films. [Hong Kong actor] Chow Yun-Fat's image in A Better Tomorrow was inspired by Takakura's image and style. I wanted to make a movie dedicated to Ken Takakura." The original film was described by Variety as a "massive hit" when it was released in China in 1978, where it was the first foreign film to be shown in post-Cultural Revolution China.

Pre-production
Manhunts producers include Gordon Chan and Chan Hing-kai while the film is being backed by the Hong Kong production company Media Asia on a budget ranging between 30 and 40 million. Manhunt marked the end of Woo's previous production company Lion Rock Films following the box-office disappointment of The Crossing which led to Woo and Terence Chang disbanding Lion Rock Productions.

Woo stated that he had "got tired of making big-budget movies. I think about going back to the old times, when it wasn't so much about money but about working with a wonderful, smaller crew to make a real movie." Woo expanded on this later stating that there was great pressure in enjoying the creative process when "being controlled by the numbers during the entire process" or deciding "decide how to shoot a scene because of the budget, not inspiration."

The production team includes Japanese art director Yohei Taneda and cinematographer Takuro Ishizaka. The film features a large Japanese cast including Yasuaki Kurata, Jun Kunimura, Hiroyuki Ikeuchi, Nanami Sakuraba, Naoto Takenaka and Tao Okamoto. In addition, Chinese actress Qi Wei and Korean actress Ha Ji-won were cast in key roles in the film.

Filming
Production started on Manhunt in June 2016 in Osaka. At the beginning of the production, the cast and crew and local government officials held a traditional Japanese kagami biraki ceremony. Woo stated that Manhunt would go back to his older style of filmmaking, referring to his film The Killer specifically.

Manhunt was projected to finished filming in October 2016 and then later reported to be finished filming by the end of November. The China Internet Information Center stated that the film had begun post-production in January 2017.

Release
Manhunt was scheduled to have its world premiere at the 74th Venice International Film Festival. The film was shown out of competition. It had press and industry screenings 6 September 2017 and a public screening on 8 September 2017. Both Woo and actress Ha Ji-won were scheduled to attended the festival in Venice.

The film received its North American premiere at the 2017 Toronto International Film Festival as part of their special presentation program. Manhunt had its first press screening in Toronto on 7 September 2017 and was scheduled for a public screening 14 September 2017.

The film was initially set for release in China on 16 February 2018. The China Internet Information Center described that waiting this long for a release is "unusual for a Chinese film". The film was released in China on 24 November 2017.

Soundtrack映画「マンハント」オリジナル・サウンドトラック''' was released by Nippon Columbia on February 21, 2018.

Track listing
 "Nightfall's Coming Over"
 "At Urban Blind Spot"
 "Dogma Lines"
 "An Unknown Daybreak"
 "Hunt on the River"
 "Secret Hunting"
 "Buddy Session"
 "Dogma Circles"
 "J's Autumn Festival"
 "Against the Investigation"
 "Introduction to Party"
 "Unpredictable Lonely Figure"
 "Interval of the Inference"
 "Keep on Seeking More"
 "Soldiers Dance"
 "Madness and Science"
 "Rule of the Assassins Duo"
 "Memories of the Illusion"
 "Dogma Links"
 "Before Attacking at Farm"
 "Run and Run"
 "Way to the Horizon"
 "Place at the End"
 "Destiny and Bond"
 "For Two Men"
 "忘れじの女/Unforgettable Woman"

Reception
Box officeManhunt has grossed a worldwide total of $18.3 million, against a production budget of $50 million.

Critical response
On review aggregator website Rotten Tomatoes, the film holds an approval rating of 67% based on 27 reviews, and an average rating of 6.2/10. On Metacritic, the film was given an average score of 68 out of 100, based on 14 critics, indicating "generally favorable reviews".

Screen Daily declared the film "a breezy, handsomely mounted fun that shows that Woo has lost neither his mojo nor his sense of poetry." and "Manhunt is a John Woo movie like he used to make ‘em, before his US period including Face/Off and Mission: Impossible 2, and recent Asian historical diptychs Red Cliff and The Crossing." Variety described Manhunt as "underwhelming and undercooked" and that the audience who come to Woo for the action scenes would be satisfied while "those of us for whom the director's best work, like the brilliant Hard Boiled or the transcendently ludicrous Face/Off, is marked out not just by superior gun-fu but by the disarming sincerity with which he always sold the silliness, Manhunt is a disappointment." The Hollywood Reporter referred to the film as a "string of sophisticated and thrilling set pieces." and that "Production values are lavish and some of the metallic sets designed by Yohei Taneda have the complexity of an Escher puzzle. Takuro Ishizaka’s lighting gives even the silly final scenes a visually exciting veneer." The review also commented on the story referring to it as "logic-free" and concluded that the film "isn’t going to go down in history as [Woo's] best film" Peter Bradshaw of The Guardian gave the film four stars out of five, stating that praised the films action sequences as a highlight while stating that the story is a "little absurd" but that the film "offers something that is never in sufficiently plentiful supply: fun."

References

External links
 
 
 Manhunt'' at Box Office Mojo

2017 films
Films shot in Osaka
Films based on Japanese novels
Films directed by John Woo
Films set in Japan
Films set in Osaka
2010s English-language films
2010s Japanese-language films
2010s Mandarin-language films
2017 action thriller films
Chinese action thriller films
Hong Kong action thriller films
Media Asia films
Films about lawyers
Films scored by Taro Iwashiro
Chinese remakes of foreign films
Remakes of Japanese films
Mandarin-language Netflix original films
2010s Hong Kong films